Ovsyannikovskaya is a rural locality (a village) in Argunovskoye Rural Settlement of Velsky District, Arkhangelsk Oblast, Russia. The population was 51 as of 2014.

Geography 
Ovsyannikovskaya is located on the Vaga River, 10 km northeast of Velsk (the district's administrative centre) by road. Luchinskaya is the nearest rural locality.

References 

Rural localities in Velsky District